Chlorocypha bambtoni is a species of damselfly in family Chlorocyphidae. It is endemic to Angola.  Its natural habitats are subtropical or tropical moist montane forests and rivers.

Sources
 Suhling, F. 2005.  Chlorocypha bambtoni.   2006 IUCN Red List of Threatened Species.   Downloaded on 9 August 2007.

Insects of Angola
Chlorocyphidae
Endemic fauna of Angola
Insects described in 1975
Taxonomy articles created by Polbot